"Sugar Moon" is a song written by Danny Wolfe and originally recorded by Pat Boone.

The song reached the top 10 on US Billboards "Most Played by Jockeys" and "Best Selling Pop Singles in Stores" charts.

Charts

References 

1958 songs
1958 singles
Dot Records singles
Pat Boone songs